Ontario Township may refer to:

 Ontario Township, Knox County, Illinois
 Ontario Township, Ramsey County, North Dakota, in Ramsey County, North Dakota
 Ontario Township, Hand County, South Dakota, in Hand County, South Dakota

See also
 List of townships in Ontario

Township name disambiguation pages